Park Nohae (born 1957) is South Korean poet, photographer and activist. His original name was Park Gi-pyeong.

Biography
Park Nohae was born in 1957 in Hampyeong, South Jeolla Province, a southern province of South Korea, and grew up in a farming town, Beolgyo, Goheung. Both his father, a pansori singer, who had participated in Korea’s independence and progressive movements, and his mother who was a devout Catholic, greatly influenced him from his childhood. Later, his brother became a priest and headed the Catholic Priests Association for Justice that took a leading role in the democratization of South Korea, and his younger sister became a nun. At the age of seven when his father suddenly passed away, his fate began to get on a wild journey, as his family became poor, and the family members had to be separated from each other. Such misfortune and solitude at his early age made him get immersed in reading and writing.

Park left his hometown and moved to Seoul, the capital city of South Korea. He worked during daytime and attended the night classes at Seollin Commercial High School. He began to build up a labor activist’s career while working in the fields of construction, textiles, chemicals, metals, and logistics. At that time, Korea was going through a dark period under the military dictatorship; night curfews were in place; freedom of the press, presidential elections, and labor’s primary rights were severely violated.

1980s, "the icon of Revolutionary" in South Korea 
The 1980s, when the labor movement was at its most active in South Korea, was also the most active period for the creation of labor poetry. The poetry of this time, represented mainly by Park Nohae and Baek Mu-san. He then took the pseudonym Park Nohae(‘No’ means ‘labor,’ ‘Hae’ means ‘liberation’) and published his first collection of poems, Dawn of Labor, in 1984, under that name. Korea was at that time under the military dictatorship of Chun Doo-hwan, with strict censorship. Despite official bans, this collection sold nearly a million copies and created intense interest. The unknown poet became an intensely symbolic figure of resistance. The government authorities tried in vain to identify and arrest him.

1990s, Demanded the death sentence, Sentenced to life imprisonment 
For many years he was active underground, helping establish the South Korean Socialist Workers' Alliance in 1989. After spending seven years of his life hiding from the police, he was finally arrested in 1991. After twenty-four days of investigation, coupled with cruel, illegal torture, at his trial the state prosecutors even demanded the death sentence for him as an enemy of the state. He was finally sentenced to life imprisonment. While he was in prison, a second poetry collection was published, True Beginning(1993) as well as a collection of essays, Only a Person is Hope(1997). He was finally freed in 1998 after being amnestied by President Kim Dae-Jung. Withdrawing from his previous role, he helped establish a nonprofit social organization “Nanum Munhwa”(Culture of Sharing) with Koreans concerned with the great challenges confronting global humanity.

2000s, Global Peace Sharing as a photographer as well as an activist 
In 2003, at the United States’ invasion of Iraq, he went to protect helpless civilians and promote peace. At that time, he undertook peace activities in Bagdad and in other Middle Eastern countries for 75 days. In 2006 he was in Lebanon on a similar peace-making mission and publicly opposed the dispatch of Korean combat troops to the Middle East. From the start he combined poetry-writing and photography, as he went to many countries that were suffering from wars and poverty, such as Palestine, Kurdistan, Pakistan, Aceh (Indonesia), Burma, India, Ethiopia, Sudan, Peru and Bolivia. In 2010 he held his first exhibition of photos “Ra Wilderness,” and since then he has continued to hold exhibitions to draw public attention to global issues of poverty, human values, and warfare. In 2010 he finally published a large new collection of poems, So You Must Not Disappear, on themes such as resistance, spirituality, education, living, revolution and love. Since then, living in a remote rural community far from Seoul, he continues, with the members of “Culture of Sharing,” to hold photo exhibitions in a dedicated gallery, the Ra Cafe and Gallery, in Seoul, also occasionally publishing photo albums, such as “Like Them, I am There,” and “Another Way.”

2016-2017 Candlelight Revolution 
When the citizens of Korea began to hold candlelight demonstrations in protest at the corruption of the Korean government under Park Geun-hae, he and the members of “Culture of Sharing” participated actively, then in 2017 published a large album book Candlelight Revolution for first anniversary of the Candlelight Revolution. He continues to be active and to write, while efforts are now underway to make his work and writings available internationally in translation.

Works

Collections of Poems 
 The Dawn of Labor (Hangul: 노동의 새벽) (First edition: Pulbit, 1984 / 30th anniversary Revised edition: Slow Walking, 2014) - His first book, sold nearly a million copies despite being banned
True Beginning  (Hangul: 참된 시작) (First edition: Changbi Publishers, 1993 / Revised edition: Slow Walking, 2016) - Prison writing, sold over a hundred thousand copies
So You Must Not Disappear (Hangul: 그러니 그대 사라지지 말아라) (Slow Walking, 2010)
Looking Up At Your Sky (Hangul: 너의 하늘을 보아) (Slow Walking, 2022)

Essay 
 Only a Person is Hope (Hangul: 사람만이 희망이다) (First edition: Hainaim, 1997 / Revised edition: Slow Walking, 2015) - Prison writing
Aceh’s Weeping for Too Long (Hangul: 아체는 너무 오래 울고 있다) (Slow Walking, 2005) - Reportage
It Seems Like Nobody Exists Here (Hangul: 여기에는 아무도 없는 것만 같아요) (Slow Walking, 2007) - Reportage
Another Way (Hangul: 다른 길) (Slow Walking, 2014) - Photographic essay
Reading While Walking Along (Hangul: 걷는 독서) (Slow Walking, 2021)

Photobook 
Ra Wilderness (Hangul: 라 광야) (Slow Walking, 2010)
Like Them, I am There (Hangul: 나 거기에 그들처럼) (Slow Walking, 2010) - Hardcover
Another Way (Hangul: 다른 길) (Slow Walking, 2014) - Hardcover

Supervised and Special Contribution 
 Candlelight Revolution (Hangul: 촛불혁명) (Slow Walking, 2017)

Photo Essay series 
01 One Day (Hangul: 하루) (Slow Walking, 2019)
02 Simply, Firmly, Gracefully (Hangul: 단순하게 단단하게 단아하게) (Slow Walking, 2020)
03 The Path (Hangul: 길) (Slow Walking, 2020)
04 My Dear Little Room (Hangul: 내 작은 방) (Slow Walking, 2022)
05 Children are Amazing (Hangul: 아이들은 놀라워라) (Slow Walking, 2022)

Poetry Picture Book 

 The Blue Light Girl (Hangul: 푸른 빛의 소녀가) (Slow Walking, 2020)

Exhibitions

Ra Wilderness
(Hangul: 라 광야) (Gallery M, Seoul, Korea, 2010) - His first photo exhibition

Like Them, I am There
(Hangul: 나 거기에 그들처럼) (Sejong Center for the Performing Arts, Seoul, Korea, 2010)

Another Way
(Hangul: 다른 길) (Sejong Center for the Performing Arts, Seoul, Korea, 2014) - Photo exhibition on Asia (Pakistan, Laos, Burma, Indonesia, Tibet, India)

Ra Cafe Gallery Permanent Exhibitions (since 2012~) 
 Photo Exhibition on Pakistan, “A Village Where Clouds Dwell” (April 16 ~ July 31, 2012)
 Photo Exhibition on Burma, “Singing Lake” (August 3 ~ October 31, 2012)
 Photo Exhibition on Tibet, “Bloom and Fall with Nothing Left” (November 2, 2012 ~ February 27, 2013)
 Photo Exhibition on Q’ero in the Andes, “Q’erotica” (March 1 ~ July 10, 2013)
 Photo Exhibition on Sudan “On the Shores of the Nile” (July 12 ~ November 13, 2013)
 Photo Exhibition on the Middle East “Ra wilderness” (November 15, 2013 ~ March 1, 2014) (Encore)
 Photo Exhibition on Ethiopia “Blooming Footsteps” (March 3 ~ July 23, 2014)
 Photo Exhibition on Latin America “Titicaca” (July 25 ~ November 19, 2014)
 Photo Exhibition on Peru “Gracias a la vida” (November 21, 2014 ~ March 18, 2015)
 Photo Exhibition on Aljazeera, titled “Like them beneath the Sun” (March 20, 2015 ~ July 15, 2015)
 Photo Exhibition on India “Dire Dire” (July 17, 2015 ~ January 13, 2016)
 Photo Exhibition on Kashmir, “Kashmir's Spring” (January 15 ~ June 29, 2016)
 Photo Exhibition on Indonesia, “The Caldera's Wind” (July 1, 2016 ~ December 28)
 Photo Exhibition on Kurds "Kurdistan” (December 30, 2016 ~ June 28, 2017)
 Photo Exhibition on Laos "Morning of Laos” (June 30, 2017 ~ February 28, 2018)
 Photo Exhibition on Palestine, “Dream of the Olive Tree” (March 2, 2018 ~ October 31)
 Photo Exhibition titled “Goodbye, and...” (November 2, 2018 ~ February 10, 2019)
Photo Exhibition titled “One Day”(Hangul: 하루) (Jun 22, 2019 ~ Jan 10, 2020)
Photo Exhibition titled “Simply, Firmly, Gracefully”(Hangul: 단순하게 단단하게 단아하게) (Jan 15, 2020 ~ Aug 30, 2020)
Photo Exhibition titled “The Path”(Hangul: 길) (Sep 1, 2020 ~ Jun 6, 2021)
Text&Photo Exhibition titled “Reading While Walking Along”(Hangul: 걷는 독서) (Jun 8, 2021 ~ Dec. 31, 2021)
Photo Exhibition titled “My Dear Little Room”(Hangul: 내 작은 방) (Jan 4, 2022 ~ Sep 18, 2022)
Photo Exhibition titled “Children are Amazing”(Hangul: 아이들은 놀라워라) (Sep 30, 2022 ~ Oct 1, 2023)

References

External links 
 Nanum Munhwa (Culture of Sharing) - a nonprofit social organization established by Park Nohae
Facebook page <Park Nohae’s Reading While Walking Along>
Instagram <Park Nohae's Reading While Walking Along> - Everyday poem with photo

Living people
1957 births
South Korean male poets
20th-century South Korean poets
21st-century South Korean poets
20th-century male writers
21st-century male writers
20th-century photographers
21st-century photographers
South Korean photographers
Street photographers